Waikiwi Rugby Club is an amateur New Zealand rugby club who currently play in Southland Wide Division I. Their clubrooms and homeground are at Donovan Park which is off Bainfield Road in the Invercargill suburb of Waikiwi.

References

External links
 http://www.pitchero.com/clubs/waikiwi/

New Zealand rugby union teams
Sport in Southland, New Zealand